Naval Home Command administered training and garrison functions for the Royal Navy from 1969 to 2012. Its commander was Commander-in-Chief, Naval Home Command (CINCNAVHOME).

History
As the Royal Navy's size decreased during the Cold War, commands were amalgamated. In 1969, the Home and Mediterranean Fleets were amalgamated, and on shore, the great historical garrison commands of Commander-in-Chief, Portsmouth and Commander-in-Chief, Plymouth were combined in July 1969. The result was Naval Home Command.

In 1992 establishments under the command's jurisdiction included Flag Officer, Portsmouth; Flag Officer Plymouth; activities at Portland; Flag Officer Scotland and Northern Ireland; Commodore HMNB Clyde; Training; Reserves; and Chief Executive Marine Services.

In 1976 the last Admiral Commanding, Reserves hauled down his flag.

Chief subordinates 
Included:
Office of the Admiral-Superintendent, Devonport, (1969–1970)
Senior Naval Officer, Northern Ireland (1969–1970)
Flag Officer, Spithead (1971–1975)
Office of the Admiral Superintendent, Portsmouth
Flag Officer, Medway, (1969–1983)
Flag Officer Commanding, Royal Yachts (1969–1997)
Flag Officer, Training and Recruitment (FOTR)

Other Royal Navy shore establishments also reported to CINCNAVHOME.

From 1994 
In 1994 the post of Commander-in-Chief Naval Home Command was unified with that of the Second Sea Lord following the rationalisation of the British Armed Forces following the end of the Cold War. The staff were housed in a new Victory Building at Portsmouth. By 2006, the primary responsibility of the CNH/2SL was to maintain operational capability by providing correctly trained manpower to the fleet.

In 2012, the appointments of both remaining Commanders-in-Chief were discontinued, with full operational command being vested instead in the First Sea Lord. when the several separate existing commands were discontinued.

Commanders-in-Chief, Naval Home Command

Included:
Admiral Sir John Frewen, 1969 – March 1970 
Admiral Sir Horace Law, March 1970 – May 1972 
Admiral Sir Andrew Lewis, May 1972 – July 1974 
Admiral Sir Derek Empson, July 1974 – November 1975 
Admiral Sir Terence Lewin, November 1975 – March 1977 
Admiral Sir David Williams, March 1977 – March 1979 
Admiral Sir Richard Clayton, March 1979 – July 1981 
Admiral Sir James Eberle, July 1981 – December 1982
Admiral Sir Desmond Cassidi, December 1982 – October 1985
Admiral Sir Peter Stanford, October 1985 – October 1987 
Admiral Sir John Woodward, October 1987 – October 1989 
Admiral Sir Jeremy Black, October 1989 – March 1991 
Admiral Sir John Kerr, March 1991 – March 1994 
Second Sea Lord and Commander-in-Chief, Naval Home Command
Admiral Sir Michael Layard, March 1994 – March 1995 
Admiral Sir Michael Boyce, May 1995 – September 1997 
Admiral Sir John Brigstocke, September 1997 – 2000 
Admiral Sir Peter Spencer, January 2000 – January 2003 
Admiral Sir James Burnell-Nugent, January 2003 – October 2005 
Vice-Admiral Sir Adrian Johns, October 2005 – July 2008 
Vice-Admiral Sir Alan Massey, July 2008 – July 2010 
Vice-Admiral Sir Charles Montgomery, July 2010 – October 2012

Chiefs of Staff, Naval Home Command
Included:
 Rear-Admiral Tim Lees-Spalding: June 1969 – June 1971
 Rear-Admiral Herbert Gardner: June 1971 – December 1973
 Rear-Admiral Roderick D. Macdonald: December 1973 – April 1976
 Rear-Admiral Thomas H. E. Baird: April 1976 – November 1977
 Rear-Admiral John M. H. Cox: November 1977 – July 1979
 Rear-Admiral Kenneth H.G. Willis: July 1979 – September 1981
 Rear-Admiral Trevor O.K. Spraggs: September 1981 – April 1983
 Rear-Admiral John P. Barker: April 1983 – December 1985
 Rear-Admiral Peter F. Grenier: December 1985 – April 1987
 Rear-Admiral Christopher J. Howard: April 1987 – April 1989
 Rear-Admiral James Carine: April 1989 – October 1991
 Rear-Admiral J. Robert Shiffner: October 1991 – May 1993
 Rear-Admiral Jeremy J. Blackham: May 1993 – February 1995 
 Rear-Admiral Rodney B. Lees : February 1995 – January 1998
 Rear-Admiral Peter A. Dunt: January 1998 – August 2000
 Rear-Admiral Roger G. Lockwood: August 2000 – September 2002
 Rear-Admiral Richard F. Cheadle: September 2002 – December 2003
 Rear-Admiral Richard G. Melly: December 2003 – March 2005
 Rear-Admiral Michael Kimmons: March 2005 – 2008

Notes

References 
 Eberle, Sir James (2007). Wider horizons: naval policy & international affairs. Durham, England: Roundtuit Publishing. .
 Heyman, Charles (2006). The Armed Forces of the United Kingdom 2007–2008. Oxford, England: Casemate Publishers. .
 Mackie, Colin (2017). "British Armed Forces: Royal Navy Appointments from 1865" (PDF). gulabin.com. Scotland, UK.

Naval Home
Military units and formations established in 1969
1969 establishments in the United Kingdom
2012 disestablishments in the United Kingdom